Stoss (Stoß), a German word meaning "shock" or "impact", may refer to:

Stoss (geography), a term describing the side of a landform that faces an advancing glacier
Stoss Pass, in Switzerland
Stoss railway station, in Gais, Switzerland
6106 Stoss, a main-belt asteroid

People
Ferdinand Stoss, United States Air Force major general
Franz Stoss (1909–1995), Austrian actor
Richard Stöss (born 1944), German political scientist
Sebastian Stoss (born 1986), Austrian swimmer
Veit Stoss (before 1450–1533), German sculptor

See also
Stoß (disambiguation)
Pavao Štoos (1806–1862), Croatian poet, priest, and revivalist

German-language surnames